The Marconi–RCA Wireless Receiving Station is a historic district at the junction of Old Comers Rd. and Orleans Rd. in Chatham, Massachusetts.  It and its companion transmitter station at Marion were used for WCC, the busiest ship to shore radio station for most of the 20th century, replacing the original WCC site in South Wellfleet.  The district includes eight red brick buildings constructed by Marconi in 1914 to house the station's operations; it was listed on the National Register of Historic Places in 1994, and is now home to the Chatham Marconi Maritime Center museum.

Station history

In 1914, inventor Guglielmo Marconi sought a more permanent solution to his weather-induced radio station woes on Cape Cod. This need was made manifest by the damage and destruction wrought by nature at his
original 1903 South Wellfleet location. The erosion and wind damage suffered by Marconi's first Cape Cod station continues to this day. Almost the entirety of the historic station is now long gone over the cliffs onto the beach and into the waters of the Atlantic below.

It was with great foresight that Marconi realized that a permanent (by 1914 commercial) presence would require a more inland and somewhat sheltered location. So it was that his Marconi Wireless Telegraph Company of America built his new receiver station in Chatham and its companion transmitter site forty miles to the west in Marion, Massachusetts through a contract with J.G. White Engineering Corp.

In 1920, the Marconi Wireless Telegraph Company of America sold the Chatham and Marion stations to the Radio Corporation of America. RCA removed all remaining Marconi equipment at the Chatham receiver station and converted it to a marine radio station for communications with ships at sea. In 1921 it was licensed under the callsign WCC for communications on 500 kHz, 750 kHz and 1 MHz. In 1922 RCA moved the transmitters to the Marion transmitter station to eliminate co-site interference to the sensitive receivers at Chatham.

The WCC marine radio transmitter equipment was moved to RCA's newly built ocean front transmitter site on Forest Beach Road in South Chatham, Massachusetts in 1948.  The U.S. Air Force subsequently used the Marion facility for VLF broadcasts to its facilities in Greenland and the Arctic.  RCA sold the Marion site to the U.S. Government in 1951 and the U.S. General Services Administration sold it to a private investor in 1960.  Most of the 143 acres that comprised the Marion transmitter site was donated to the Sippican Lands Trust in 1986 and is publicly accessible. Radio Tower Property

In 1988, RCA Global Communications sold its WCC receiver site in Chatham and its Forest Beach transmitter site in South Chatham to Western Union International, a subsidiary of MCI Communications, as part of the breakup of RCA.  Ten years later, MCI/Worldcom sold the WCC sites—nearly 100 acres in total—to the town of Chatham for a fraction of their value.

In 1993, WCC became a remotely controlled station, using fiber optic cable to receive signals, transmit signals and issue such commands such as rotating WCC's directional antennas. Even the keying of Morse Code (CW) and Radioteletype (RTTY) was issued remotely at this early date in the public internet's infancy. WCC was operated from KPH Radio in Point Reyes, California until its closing.

The Chatham WCC receiver site is now the Chatham Marconi Maritime Center, and the home of amateur radio station WA1WCC, licensed to the WCC Amateur Radio Association.  The South Chatham transmitter site is now preserved as open space.

The callsign WCC is now used by Globe Wireless for a Maryland station it operates to transmit automated e-mail-by-radio.

The station was the subject of the Mooncusser Films documentary Chatham Radio: WCC the Untold Story, narrated by Walter Cronkite and directed by Christopher Seufert.

Historic contacts
1928: communication with Richard E. Byrd's first South Pole expedition
1929: communication with the Graf Zeppelin during world's first around-the-world trip by air
1933: sends weather information to Charles Lindbergh
1937: possible last communication with the Hindenburg prior to explosion
1961: communication with Santa Maria (callsign CSAL) during hijacking

See also
 Cape Cod National Seashore
 Coast radio station
 KPH (radio)
 National Register of Historic Places listings in Barnstable County, Massachusetts

References

External links

Transport infrastructure completed in 1914
Commercial buildings on the National Register of Historic Places in Massachusetts
Telecommunications buildings on the National Register of Historic Places
National Register of Historic Places in Barnstable County, Massachusetts
Chatham, Massachusetts
Historic districts on the National Register of Historic Places in Massachusetts